Methylecgonine is a prominent tropane alkaloid found in coca leaves. It is metabolite of cocaine, and maybe is used as precursor for it. It also occurs as minor alkaloid in roots of many Datura species such as Datura stramonium and Datura innoxia.

Biosynthesis 
It is the last step before cocaine is biosynthesized in coca plants with the help of BAHD acyltransferase.

Animal study 
Animals study suggest that it has beneficial effect on cognition and protects against cocaine lethality. It showed inhibition of sodium channels only at very high dosages.

See also 
 Ecgonine

References 

Tropane alkaloids